And Now! is the third studio album by the Southern soul band Booker T. & the M.G.'s, released in November 1966. It is notable as the first M.G.'s album featuring bassist Duck Dunn on every track. “My Sweet Potato” was the only track released as a single, with “Booker Loo” (not included on the album) as its B-side. “Summertime” was released in 1967 as the B-side to the song “Hip Hug-Her”.

Track listing

Side one
“My Sweet Potato” (Steve Cropper, Booker T. Jones, Al Jackson Jr.) – 2:47
“Jericho” (Traditional; arranged by Booker T & the MGs) – 2:37
“No Matter What Shape (Your Stomach's In)” (Granville "Sascha" Burland) – 3:01
“One Mint Julep” (Rudy Toombs) – 3:05
“In the Midnight Hour” (Steve Cropper, Wilson Pickett) – 2:58
“Summertime” (George Gershwin, Ira Gershwin, Dubose Heyward) – 4:41

Side two
“Working in the Coal Mine” (Lee Dorsey, Allen Toussaint) – 2:42
“Don't Mess up a Good Thing” (Oliver Sain) – 2:44
“Think” (Lowman Pauling) – 2:58
“Taboo” (Bob Russell, Margarita Lecuona) – 4:25
“Soul Jam” (Cropper, Donald "Duck" Dunn, Jones, Jackson Jr.) – 3:05
“Sentimental Journey” (Les Brown, Bud Green, Ben Homer) – 3:13

Personnel 
Booker T. & the M.G.s
Booker T. Jones – "plunk", piano, organ, guitar
Steve Cropper – "strum", guitar, electric bass on "My Sweet Potato"
Donald Dunn – "thump", bass guitar, claves on "My Sweet Potato"
Al Jackson Jr. – "boom", drums 
Technical
Ronnie "Angel" Stoots – cover design

References 

Booker T. & the M.G.'s albums
1966 albums
Albums produced by Jim Stewart (record producer)
Stax Records albums
Atlantic Records albums